Del Norte County  (Spanish for "Of The North") is a county at the far northwest corner of the U.S. state of California, along the Pacific Ocean adjacent to the Oregon border.  Its population is 27,743 as of the 2020 census, down from 28,610 from the 2010 census. The county seat and only incorporated city is Crescent City. Del Norte was pioneered and populated by Azorean Portuguese settlers and dairy farmers, which may account for the local pronunciation of the county name. Locals pronounce the county name as Del Nort, not Del Nor-teh as would be expected in Spanish.

Del Norte County comprises the Crescent City, CA Micropolitan Statistical Area.

This northernmost county on the California coast also has scores of unique plants and flowers, dozens of species of coastal birds and fish, rocky primitive beaches and sea stacks, pristine rivers, and historic lighthouses.

History
The area that is now known as Del Norte was and still is inhabited by the Yurok (Klamath River Indians) and Tolowa Nations of indigenous peoples. The first European American to explore this land was pioneer Jedediah Smith in the early-19th century. He was the first European American to reach the area overland on foot in a time before the European Americans knew anything about such a distant territory. For him it was literally "Land's End" — where the American continent ended at the Pacific Ocean. In 1855 Congress authorized the building of a lighthouse at "the battery point" (a high tide island on the coast of Crescent City) which is still functioning as a historical landmark.

Del Norte County was established in 1857, from part of the territory of Klamath County following the great California Gold Rush. Klamath County itself ceased to exist in 1874.

Geography

The mountainous terrain associated with the Coastal Range and the Klamath Mountains dominates
Del Norte County's geography. Elevation ranges from sea level to over 6,400 feet. Although much of the
county is made up of steep terrain, there are small patches of flat terrain along the coast and in isolated
mountain valleys. There are 37 miles of coastline in the county, forming a coastal zone that covers
approximately 51,000 acres (80 square miles). A broad coastal plain can be found in the northwest
portion of the county with the western edge of the Klamath Mountains as its easterly boundary. Rising
abruptly from the coastal plain, the Klamath Mountains extend north into Oregon and are situated
between the Cascade Range to the east and the Coast Range to the north.

Adjacent counties
 Curry County, Oregon - northwest
 Josephine County, Oregon - northeast
 Siskiyou County - east
 Humboldt County - south

Beach
 Pelican State Beach

Recreation area
 Smith River National Recreation Area

Rivers
 Klamath - one of the longest in California.
 Smith - a crown jewel of the National Wild and Scenic River program.

Wildlife refuge
 Castle Rock National Wildlife Refuge

Parks

 Del Norte Coast Redwoods State Park
 Jedediah Smith Redwoods State Park
 Redwood National Park
 Tolowa Dunes State Park
 Ruby Van Deventer County Park
 Florence Keller County Park

Ecology

There is a diversity of flora and fauna within Del Norte County. Vegetative plant associations feature several forest types including mixed oak forest. The California endemic Blue oak, Quercus douglasii is at the northernmost part of its range in Del Norte County. The Black Oak and Douglas-fir are also found in Del Norte County.

Demographics

2011

Places by population, race, and income

2010

The 2010 United States Census reported that Del Norte County had a population of 28,610. The racial makeup of Del Norte County was 21,098 (73.7%) White, 993 (3.5%) African American, 2,244 (7.8%) Native American, 965 (3.4%) Asian, 32 (0.1%) Pacific Islander, 1,980 (6.9%) from other races, and 1,298 (4.5%) from two or more races. Hispanic or Latino of any race were 5,093 persons (17.8%).

2000
As of the census of 2000, there were 27,507 people, 9,170 households, and 6,290 families residing in the county. The population density was 27 people per square mile (11/km2). There were 10,434 housing units at an average density of 10 per square mile (4/km2). The racial makeup of the county was 78.9% White, 4.3% Black or African American, 6.4% Native American, 2.3% Asian, 0.1% Pacific Islander, 3.9% from other races, and 4.1% from two or more races. 13.9% of the population were Hispanic or Latino of any race. 16.2% were of German, 11.3% English, 9.1% Irish and 7.4% American ancestry according to Census 2000. 91.6% spoke English and 6.2% Spanish as their first language.

There were 9,170 households, out of which 33.5% had children under the age of 18 living with them, 50.0% were married couples living together, 13.6% had a female householder with no husband present, and 31.4% were non-families. 25.3% of all households were made up of individuals, and 10.1% had someone living alone who was 65 years of age or older. The average household size was 2.58 and the average family size was 3.08.

The age distribution was 25.1% under the age of 18, 8.0% from 18 to 24, 32.2% from 25 to 44, 22.3% from 45 to 64, and 12.5% who were 65 years of age or older. The median age was 36 years. For every 100 females there were 123.3 males. For every 100 females age 18 and over, there were 130.3 males.

The median income for a household in the county was $29,642, and the median income for a family was $36,056. Males had a median income of $40,072 versus $22,212 for females. The per capita income for the county was $14,573. About 16.4% of families and 20.2% of the population were below the poverty line, including 26.7% of those under age 18 and 8.2% of those age 65 or over.

Education
Del Norte County is home to a satellite campus of College of the Redwoods, a two-year college based in Humboldt County.

Del Norte County has one of just five combined county office of education-unified school district learning educational agencies (LEA) in the state of California, with one elected Board of Trustees that serves both agencies, and one superintendent overseeing both the County Office of Education, and the Unified School District.

The Del Norte County Unified School District, which covers the entire county, provides public education from pre-Kindergarten through the twelfth grade. The only high school in Del Norte County is Del Norte High School, whose school mascot is the Warrior. There are also five K-5 elementary schools (Bess Maxwell, Joe Hamilton, Margaret Keating, Mary Peacock, Pine Grove), three K-8 elementary schools (Mountain, Redwood, Smith River), and one middle school (Crescent Elk).

The County Office of Education provides special education services to the county, as well as alternative learning options that includes Community Day and juvenile detention. Alternative educational facilities are Del Norte Community Day, Elk Creek detention center, and Sunset Continuation High School.

Del Norte County has several private parochial schools and charter schools.

Politics
Del Norte is traditionally a strongly Republican county in Presidential and congressional elections. The last Democrat to win a majority in the county was Jimmy Carter in 1976; even so, Bill Clinton received a plurality in 1992. In 2016, with Orange County flipping, Del Norte County became the only county on California's coast to vote for Donald Trump over Hillary Clinton. As of 2020, it is now the only county on California's coast that votes Republican for President.

  
  
  
  
  
  
  
  
  
  
  
  
  
  
  
  
  
  
  
  
  
  
  
  
  
  
  
  
  
  
  

The county has almost an even split in Democratic and Republican voter registration. As of May 2008, approximately 67% of eligible voters are registered to vote in Del Norte County, with approximately 38% registered as Democrats and approximately 38% registered as Republicans, with the State of California reporting 32 more Republicans than Democrats on April 7, 2010. Third party affiliation accounts for approximately 6% of all registered voters in the county.

Voter registration statistics

Cities by population and voter registration

Crime 

The following table includes the number of incidents reported and the rate per 1,000 persons for each type of offense.

Cities by population and crime rates

Transportation

Major highways
  U.S. Route 101
  U.S. Route 199
  State Route 169
  State Route 197

Public transportation
Local public transit is provided by Redwood Coast Transit, which provides access to Amtrak passenger train (via Amtrak bus) service.

Airports
Contour Airlines conducts passenger flights to and from Jack McNamara Field Airport, operating one daily round trip flight to Oakland International Airport. Flights are largely subsidized by an Alternate Essential Air Service grant approved by the United States Department of Transportation and issued to the Border Coast Regional Airport Authority in 2020.

Harbor
The Crescent City Harbor serves as a commercial fishing port for salmon, shrimp, tuna, cod, and dungeness crab commercial fishing boats. Nearly 50% of all dungeness crab served in California restaurants is off-loaded in this harbor. The harbor is also home to multiple fishing and non-fishing related businesses and harbor governmental offices. The harbor also has several pleasure boat docks.

Communities
Crescent City is the county seat of and only incorporated city in Del Norte County. Its population count includes the inmates of Pelican Bay State Prison located ten miles north of the city.

Cities
Crescent City

Census-designated places

Bertsch–Oceanview
Fort Dick
Gasquet
Hiouchi
Klamath
Smith River
Crescent City North – former CDP

Other unincorporated communities
Adams Station
Darlingtonia
Douglas Park
Klamath Glen
Pacific Shores
Requa
Rockland
Yontocket

Population ranking

The population ranking of the following table is based on the 2020 census of Del Norte County.

† county seat

See also 

 Hiking trails in Del Norte County
 National Register of Historic Places listings in Del Norte County, California
 Things to Do, Outdoor Recreation & Visitor Information

Notes

References

External links

 
 Del Norte County & Crescent City Tourism and Travel website
 Chamber of Commerce website
 Del Norte Historical Society

 
California counties
1857 establishments in California
Populated places established in 1857